is the Christopher Strachey Professor of Computing in the Department of Computer Science, University of Oxford.

She undertook her BSc (1992) and MSc (1994) at the University of Keio, Japan, before completing her PhD (1996) jointly at the universities of Keio and Manchester.

References

External links 
Official personal page

Japanese computer scientists
Living people
Academics of the Department of Computing, Imperial College London
Year of birth missing (living people)